Longosuchus (meaning "Long's crocodile") is an extinct genus of aetosaur from the Late Triassic of North America and Morocco. It measured about 3 metres in length.

Taxonomy

Longosuchus was originally named as a species of Typothorax, T. meadei, in 1947 on the basis of skeletal remains from the Otis Chalk quarries in Howard County, western Texas. Hunt and Lucas (1990) recognized T. meadei as generically distinct from the type species of Typothorax and renamed it Longosuchus in honor of Robert Long.

References 

Aetosaurs of North America
Late Triassic pseudosuchians
Fossil taxa described in 1990
Prehistoric pseudosuchian genera